The Daddy of Them All is a 1914 American silent comedy film featuring Oliver Hardy.

Plot

Cast
 Bert Tracy as Ezra Jenkins (as Herbert Tracy)
 Eva Bell as Mrs. Jenkins
 Royal Byron as Michael Muldoon (as Roy Byron)
 Harry Lorraine as Hez Whipple
 Vincente DePascale as Pietro Olivatto (as V. Pascale)
 Oliver Hardy as Peitzheimer (as Babe Hardy)
 Billy Bowers as Chairman
 James Levering as Secretary

See also
 List of American films of 1914
 Oliver Hardy filmography

External links

1914 films
American silent short films
American black-and-white films
1914 comedy films
1914 short films
Films directed by Arthur Hotaling
Silent American comedy films
American comedy short films
1910s American films